SMATV is Single Master Antenna Television (or Satellite Master Antenna Television),
The purpose of SMATV is for supplying and controlling the number and type of channels to multiple televisions. Not only TV channels but FM channels as well. It provides Reception of DBS TV/FM channels for hotels, motels, dormitories, schools, hospitals and commercial properties with multiple tenants. Using a master antenna system video signals, audio signals and decoder signals can also be distributed.

It consists of single outdoor unit or antenna feeding to number of indoor units. The channels accessible are independent of other users.

A SMATV headend is used to receive and rebroadcast satellite television channels throughout a property from a single satellite feed.

The system consists of a master antenna and a matching transformer to match the balanced antenna with unbalanced cable and amplifiers. Most antennas have an impedance of around 300 Ω. To convert it to 75 Ω, a matching transformer (or balun) is used. For trunk line isolation, a resistive inductive device known as a splitter is used. The amplifier output is fed to the splitter through coaxial trunk lines.

There are several methods of distribution that are often used in a SMATV headend. These include:
 IPTV (Internet Protocol) TV Systems
 COM1000 Pro:Idiom Encrypted HD Headend
 L-Band Satellite TV Distribution
There are two main approaches for distribution of digital TV signals in SMATV installations:
 Transmodulation from satellite quaternary phase shift keying QPSK to quadrature amplitude modulation QAM
 Direct distribution of QPSK

In the United States, the satellite carriers providing the satellite TV signal for SMATV headend systems are:
DirecTV
Dish Network Smatv

References

Satellite television